Bilal Mehsud (born 7 September 1995) is a Pakistani professional boxer who is currently the Pakistan Super Light champion.

Early life 
Bilal Mehsud was born on 7 September 1995 in South Waziristan, Pakistan.

Professional boxing

Early career 
On 30 November 2017, Bilal made his debut against Muhammad Shakir Mehmood Khan which Bilal won by knockout. In his second match, Bilal defeated Naseem Khan by knockout, then Iftikhar Ahmad. Asad Ullah and Amin Ul Haq were also defeated by Bilal Mehsud.

First international opponent 
On 20 July 2019, the Pakistan super lightweight champion Bilal Mehsud faced the WBC Asia Silver Super Light Champion Giesler AP. Their match ended in a tie. However Bilal said that he knocked out Giesler twice in the fifth and sixth rounds and this was an unfair match. He wrote a letter to WBC for a rematch.

2020 fights 
On 9 February 2020, Bilal faced Hujjatullah Zulfiqar. Bilal won the match. On 3 October 2020, Afghani boxer Amin Ul Haq had a rematch against Bilal. However Amin was again defeated by Bilal. On 31 October 2020, Bilal defeated Haroon Khan by technical knockout.

First defeat 
On 19 December 2020, Bilal Mehsud lost to Manzoor Shujat by decision. However Mehsud told how the match was unfair and also gave video footage for proof.

Professional boxing record

References

External links
 

Living people
1995 births
Pakistani male boxers
Light-welterweight boxers